Leesa may refer to:

People
 Leesa Clark, American television journalist
 Leesa Gazi (born 1969), Bangladeshi playwright
 Leesa Kahn (born 1949), Australian film producer 
 Leesa Vlahos (born 1966), former Australian politician

See also
 Lisa (given name)
 Liisa (given name)
 Elizabeth (given name) (Liza)